is a Japanese football for Hokkaido Consadole Sapporo.

National team career
In June 2011, Awaka was elected Japan U-17 national team for 2011 U-17 World Cup. He played 1 match against New Zealand.

Club statistics
Updated to 18 February 2019.

References

External links

Profile at Ehime FC
Profile at Consadole Sapporo

1995 births
Living people
Association football people from Hokkaido
Japanese footballers
J1 League players
J2 League players
J3 League players
Japan Football League players
Hokkaido Consadole Sapporo players
SC Sagamihara players
Honda FC players
Ehime FC players
J.League U-22 Selection players
Suzuka Point Getters players
Association football goalkeepers
People from Iwamizawa, Hokkaido